Polyphony is a musical texture consisting of two or more independent melodic voices.

Polyphony may also refer to:
 Polyphony (choir)
 Polyphony (literature)
Polyphony (Russian Orthodox liturgy)

See also 

 Polyphony and monophony in instruments
 Polyphony Digital, a Sony video game developing company
 Polyphonic (producer), an American record producer
 Polyphonia, a ballet choreograph by Christopher Wheeldon